Artur Garikovich Arustamyan (born 28 May 1997) is a Russian football player. He plays for FC KAMAZ Naberezhnye Chelny.

Club career
He made his debut in the Russian Football National League for FC Fakel Voronezh on 12 March 2017 in a game against FC Khimki.

References

External links
 Profile by Russian Football National League

1997 births
Footballers from Voronezh
Living people
Russian footballers
Association football forwards
FC Fakel Voronezh players
FC Metallurg Lipetsk players
FC Yenisey Krasnoyarsk players
FC KAMAZ Naberezhnye Chelny players
Russian First League players
Russian Second League players